Elenchus tenuicornis is an insect species in the genus Elenchus.

Strepsiptera